Nchifor Valery  is a Cameroonian television personality. He is known for the movie Obsession, which for which he won best male actor at the 2011 London-run ZAFAA Award. He also won best male actor in a lead role at the red feather award 2017.

Background 
Valery is a born Cameroon, some sources say in 1989. He graduated with B.Ed in education at the University of Buea.

Career 
Valery started his professional career as a television actor in Buea, in the movie Leather Gangsters, released in 2006 .  “The high point of my career so far being when I was nominated for best up coming at the ZAFAA global awards (ZAFAA) in London were I traveled to and won the award in the particular category amongst big names from Ghana Nigeria and south Africa. ”, Valery told Njokatv. He has featured in over 40 movies which include short films, television series. In 2012 he was the best actor in a supporting role which earn him another award in that category at the Cameroon Movie Merit Awards, CMMA, edition 2012 organized by Fred Keyanti.

Selected filmography
A Man for the Weekend (2017) with Syndy Emade, Alexx Ekubo
Obsession (2011)
Leather Gangsters
Expression

Awards and recognition

See also 
 List of Cameroonian Actors
 Cinema of Cameroon

References

External links

1989 births
Cameroonian male actors
Cameroonian film directors
Living people
People from Bamenda